Marcos Sebastián Rouzies (born 22 May 1997) is an Argentine professional footballer who plays as a centre-back for Gimnasia Concepción.

Career
Rouzies began his career in the system of Godoy Cruz. Prior to his senior bow, the centre-back was an unused substitute on two occasions; in the Primera División versus Boca Juniors and in the Copa Libertadores against Palmeiras. He made his debut on 27 July 2019, starting an eventual 3–2 loss to San Lorenzo in Godoy's opening fixture of 2019–20; though was substituted off for Agustín Aleo at half-time. Rouzies left in mid-2020, subsequently heading to Primera B Metropolitana with Deportivo Armenio. His first appearances arrived in December against San Telmo, San Miguel, Defensores Unidos and Talleres. 

In June 2022, Rouzies joined Gimnasia Concepción.

Career statistics
.

References

External links

1997 births
Living people
Sportspeople from Mendoza, Argentina
Argentine footballers
Association football defenders
Argentine Primera División players
Primera B Metropolitana players
Godoy Cruz Antonio Tomba footballers
Deportivo Armenio footballers
Deportivo Maipú players
Gimnasia y Esgrima de Concepción del Uruguay footballers